Sodeif Badri (born 1972) is an Iranian conservative politician, academic and former mayor of Ardabil. He was born in Germi, Ardabil province. He is a member of the tenth Islamic Consultative Assembly from the electorate of Ardabil, Nir, Namin and Sareyn.

References

Living people
Deputies of Ardabil, Nir, Namin and Sareyn
People from Ardabil
Mayors of Ardabil
Members of the 10th Islamic Consultative Assembly
1972 births
Imam Hossein University alumni
University of Tabriz alumni